Yvonne Li (born 30 May 1998) is a German badminton player. She won bronze medals at the 2015 and 2017 European Junior Championships in the girls' doubles and singles respectively. Li who affiliate with SC Union 08 Lüdinghausen was the three-time National Champion in the women's singles winning from 2019 to 2021, and she also won the women's doubles in 2020.

Achievements

European Junior Championships 
Girls' singles

Girls' doubles

BWF World Tour (1 runner-up) 
The BWF World Tour, which was announced on 19 March 2017 and implemented in 2018, is a series of elite badminton tournaments sanctioned by the Badminton World Federation (BWF). The BWF World Tours are divided into levels of World Tour Finals, Super 1000, Super 750, Super 500, Super 300 (part of the HSBC World Tour), and the BWF Tour Super 100.

Women's singles

BWF International Challenge/Series (4 titles, 5 runners-up) 
Women's singles

Women's doubles

Mixed doubles

  BWF International Challenge tournament
  BWF International Series tournament
  BWF Future Series tournament

BWF Junior International 

Girls' singles

  BWF Junior International Grand Prix tournament
  BWF Junior International Challenge tournament
  BWF Junior International Series tournament
  BWF Junior Future Series tournament

References

External links 
 

1998 births
Living people
Sportspeople from Hamburg
German female badminton players
German people of Chinese descent
German sportspeople of Chinese descent
Badminton players at the 2019 European Games
European Games competitors for Germany
Badminton players at the 2020 Summer Olympics
Olympic badminton players of Germany